Get Some Fun is the third studio album by the Australian power pop group, Sunnyboys. It was produced by Nick Garvey, formerly of The Motors and released in April 1984 on Mushroom Records. It peaked at No. 36 on the Australian Kent Music Report albums chart, but like all of the band's first three albums has come to be regarded as a classic of its time.

Background
For this album, the band hired new management in the form of Michael Chugg and in May 1983 Sunnyboys returned to the studio to record a new single, "Show Me Some Discipline" which possessed a darker soul to the band's previous fare. Get Some Fun was  released in April 1984. All ten songs were recent creations with the exception of "Catch My Heart," which had been around since the band's inception.

Track listing

Charts

Release history

Personnel
Sunnyboys
 Bil Bilson – drums
 Richard Burgman – guitar
 Jeremy Oxley – guitar, vocals
 Peter Oxley – bass guitar

References 

1984 albums
Sunnyboys albums
Mushroom Records albums